Rt Rev Harold Nickinson Rodgers (6 July 1881 – 22 June 1947) was the third Anglican Bishop of Sherborne in the modern era.

Educated at Corpus Christi College, Cambridge, he was ordained in 1910 and his ministry began with a  curacy at St Jude's, Southsea; after which he was Vicar of Havant (and latterly Rural Dean). Subsequently, he served as Archdeacon of Portsmouth in 1927, Archdeacon of Dorset (1940–47) and Bishop of Sherborne (1936–47). He died in Salisbury in 1947. His Times obituary described him as "an able administrator".

References

1881 births
1947 deaths
Alumni of Corpus Christi College, Cambridge
Archdeacons of Portsmouth
Archdeacons of Dorset
Bishops of Sherborne
20th-century Church of England bishops